Linhardt is a surname. Notable people with the surname include:

Christina Linhardt, German-American singer, actor, and director
Robert J. Linhardt, American Professor

See also
Linhart
Lienhard
Lienhart
Lienhardt